Cozen's test is a physical examination performed to evaluate for lateral epicondylitis or, tennis elbow. The test is said to be positive if a resisted wrist extension triggers pain to the lateral aspect of the elbow owing to stress placed upon the tendon of the extensor carpi radialis brevis muscle. The test is performed with extended elbow.  NOTE: With elbow flexed the extensor carpi radialis longus is in a shortened position as its origin is the lateral suracondylar ridge of the humerus.  To rule out the ECRB (extensor carpi radialis brevis), repeat the test with the elbow in full extension.

References

Physical examination
Medical signs